Helena Vuković (born 23 August 2000) is Croatian judoka. 
She was placed 5th in the European Championship and is current world champion in the 70 kg+ category for cadets. In September 2017 she was proclaimed to be the most successful female junior athlete in Croatia for past year by Croatian Olympic Committee. She was also placed third in -78 kg category on Croatian senior championship.

She attended Lucijan Vranjanin Gymnasium in Zagreb.

References

External links
 

Living people
2000 births
Sportspeople from Zagreb